Iamia majanohamensis is a Gram-positive bacterium from the genus of Iamia which has been isolated from the sea cucumber (Holothuria edulis) on the Aka Island in Japan.

References 

Actinomycetota
Bacteria described in 2009